Megachile gigas is a species of bee in the family Megachilidae. It was described by Schrottky in 1908.

References

Gigas
Insects described in 1908